Henry "Harry" Huth (14 February 1856 — ) born in Huddersfield, was an English cricketer and rugby union footballer who played in the 1870s. He played representative level rugby union (RU) for England, and at club level for Huddersfield, as a Fullback, i.e. number 15, he died in Kensington. Prior to Tuesday 27 August 1895, Huddersfield was a rugby union club.

Playing career

International honours
Henry Huth won a cap for England while at Huddersfield in the 1878–79 Home Nations rugby union match against Scotland.

Change of Code
When Huddersfield converted from the rugby union code to the rugby league code on Tuesday 27 August 1895, Henry Huth would have been 39. Consequently, he may have been too old to have been both a rugby union and rugby league footballer for Huddersfield.

Cricket
Huth also played one first-class cricket match, for the Gentlemen of the North, in 1877.

Note
If Henry Huth's birth date (14 February 1856) and death date (31 December 1929) on ESPNscrum are correct, then he would have been 73 years old at his death. However, FreeBMD quotes the age at death of an Henry Huth registered during October–December 1929 in Kensington district as being 72.

References

External links
Statistics at espnscrum.com
Biography of Arthur Budd with an England team photograph including Henry Huth 
Search for "Huth" at rugbyleagueproject.org

1856 births
1929 deaths
England international rugby union players
English rugby union players
Huddersfield Giants players
Cricketers from Huddersfield
Rugby union fullbacks
English cricketers
Gentlemen of the North cricketers
Rugby union players from Huddersfield